Handycraft Farmstead, also known as Ewetopia, is a historic farm located at Washington Township in Franklin County, Pennsylvania. The contributing buildings are a hewn timber frame Pennsylvania barn (c. 1840), hewn log secondary house (c. 1830), octagonal stone smoke house (c. 1830), and an animal barn / shed dated to the late-19th or early 20th century.  The main house (c. 1790) has been substantially modified and is non-contributing.

It was listed on the National Register of Historic Places in 2002.

References 

Farms on the National Register of Historic Places in Pennsylvania
Houses completed in 1790
Houses completed in 1830
Infrastructure completed in 1840
Buildings and structures in Franklin County, Pennsylvania
1830 establishments in Pennsylvania
National Register of Historic Places in Franklin County, Pennsylvania